The Valley Blue Sox are a collegiate summer baseball team based in Holyoke, Massachusetts. The team, a member of the New England Collegiate Baseball League, plays its home games at Mackenzie Stadium. The Blue Sox were founded in 2001 as the Concord Quarry Dogs but moved following the 2007 season to Holyoke to fill the void left by the departure of the Holyoke Giants to Lynn, Massachusetts. In 2017, the team won its first NECBL championship against the Ocean State Waves.

Team history

Concord Quarry Dogs

The Concord Quarry Dogs were founded in 2001, as the second NECBL team in the state of New Hampshire. The team led the league in attendance their inaugural year. Despite making the postseason in both 2002 and 2003, the fan base slowly began to dwindle. Attendance slipped dramatically in 2004 with the arrival of the New Hampshire Fisher Cats in nearby Manchester, New Hampshire.  In 2006, average attendance was only 503 per game.  Following the 2007 season, the team was purchased by the brother-sister team of Barry Wadsworth and Karen Rella who had hoped to help keep the team in Concord.  But shortly thereafter, citing increased rent costs and low attendance, they began their search for a new home.

Move to Holyoke

With the departure of the Holyoke Giants after the 2007 season, the new ownership group decided to move their team to Holyoke, Massachusetts. Their first year in Holyoke, the Blue Sox finished just under a .500 record and 8 games behind the division winning and eventual NECBL champions Sanford Mainers.

In 2009, the Blue Sox enjoyed far greater success than their inaugural season in Holyoke, finishing with a 20-21 record, earning the fourth and final West Division playoff spot after a one-game playoff with the Danbury Westerners. The Blue Sox then upset the #1 seeded Keene Swamp Bats in the Division Semifinal round, becoming the first ever #4 seed to defeat a #1 seed in the playoffs. However, the Blue Sox were then defeated by the Vermont Mountaineers in the Division Finals. The 2009 season was highlighted by Holyoke's hosting the 2009 NECBL All-Star Game at Mackenzie Stadium. The game saw a record-breaking attendance figure for the event of 4,906.

In 2011, the team finished with a 28-14 record, sharing the West Division regular-season title with the Keene. The team's attendance figures made a dramatic jump, rising from 39th in 2010 to 3rd in collegiate summer baseball. An average of 2,510 spectators attended each game.

New ownership and name change

In 2013, former Wisconsin Woodchucks owner Clark Eckhoff purchased the team and assumed the role of team president. The 2013 squad advanced to the postseason by winning a play-in game with the Saratoga Brigade before falling 2–1 in the West Division Semifinals to the eventual champions, the Keene Swamp Bats.

In May 2014, the organization announced it would be changing the team's name to the Valley Blue Sox.

Quick turnaround and first championship
In September 2013, Eckhoff hired General Manager Hunter Golden. Despite winning only 13 games in 2014, the team made a 5-win improvement under Golden in the 2015 season with the help and leadership of newly-appointed Manager John Raiola. The team also saw its attendance grow to second in the NECBL in their tenure and 29th nationally among all summer collegiate teams according to Ballpark Digest.

In 2016, the team displaced the Newport Gulls as the top-drawing team in the league, and ranked 11th nationally among all Summer Collegiate Baseball teams in attendance. The success off the field was the same as the success on the field, as the team continued its upward trajectory under the Golden/Raiola tandem, as they finished second in the division with 24 wins on the season. After a dramatic walk-off victory in the division semi-finals, the team jumped out to a 1-0 series lead in the Northern Division Finals against the Sanford Mainers. In one of the more dramatic playoff games in NECBL history, the Blue Sox led the deciding game-3 2-1 heading into the 8th inning. A Sam Stauble triple and a Shane Hughes walk off 3-run HR ended the Sox run, but provided the team with a foundation to build to 2017.

In 2017, the Sox repeated their success of 2016 by qualifying for the NECBL playoffs a second consecutive year, replicating the success of only three other franchises in the league. The team continued to wrack up strong attendance numbers, drawing 2,800 fans+ in five consecutive games headed down the stretch run. The team would go on to win 12 of its last 13 games and not lose a single playoff game - capturing the team's first NECBL Championship in franchise history - sweeping through the playoffs an defeating the Ocean State Waves in the championship series.

In the 2018 season, the Blue Sox once again captured the league championship, winning back to back years, as they once again defeated the Ocean State Waves to capture the title; resulting in the Blue Sox being ranked the #1 Summer College Team in the Unite States. 

In 2018, John Raiola was promoted to the Director of Baseball Operations and Chris Weyant as the General Manager. The team maintained it's high level of success, finishing second in the Northern division before falling to the Keene Swamp Bats in the Division Finals, marking the fourth straight season the franchise had made it to the Final Four of the league. 

While the 2020 season was cancelled due to the COVID-19 Pandemic, 2021 brought a new dawn, as Raiola stepped down as manager in favor of former Blue Sox Outfielder and later hitting coach Hezekiah Randolph. Kate Avard once an intern - was named the team's general manager; among the first female general managers in league history. The Blue Sox found themselves swept up in divisional realignment, being moved to the south division where they finished in third place with a 23-19 mark, good enough for third place. The Blue Sox would fall to the eventual 2021 champion Danbury Westerners in the playoffs.

Postseason appearances

Accolades

Records
Below is a list of New England Collegiate Baseball League records set by players of the Concord Quarry Dogs and Holyoke/Valley Blue Sox, as of the end of the 2017 season.

Note: An asterisk (*) denotes the record being held by a member of the Concord Quarry Dogs.

Individual
Earned run average* - 0.00 by Tyler Smith, 2017
Games Played* - 24 by Matt Elfeldt, 2001

Team
Hit by pitch* - 55, 2004

Awards
Below is a list of awards won by members of the Concord Quarry Dogs and Holyoke/Valley Blue Sox.

End-of-season awards
2001 Defensive Player of the Year* - Matt Tupman
2001 Top Pitcher* - John Velosky
2001 Top Relief Pitcher* - Matt Elfeldt
2002 Top Pro Prospect* - Grant Reynolds
2002 Top Pitcher* - Grant Reynolds
2003 Sportsmanship Award* - Angus Fredenburg and Bobby Tewksbury
2009 Rick Ligi Most Valuable Player Award - Jim Wood
2011  Ben Mount Pitcher of the year - Jim Wood
2011  Ronnie Freeman Sportsmanship Award - Jim Wood
2011  Trey Mancini Rookie of the Year - Jim Wood
2013  Michael Burke Pitcher of the year - Jim Wood
2015  Manny De Jesus Jr Defensive Player of the Year - Jim Wood
2016  Kyle Mottice 10th Man Award - Jim Wood

All-NECBL Team
2001* - All-League Team: P All-Division Team: 3B Brock Koman, C Matt Tupman, P Matt Elfeldt
2002* - First Team: SS P Grant Reynolds; Second Team: P Chris Lambert
2003* - First Team: 2B Second Team: SS Bobby Tewksbury, DH Chris Looze
2004* - Second Team: SS DH Devin Thomas
2005* - First Team: 2B Second Team: 1B Jerod Edmondson, OF Will Bashelor
2009 - First Team: OF  Second Team: 3B Jake Rosenbeck
2011 - First Team: C  Second Team: C Ronnie Freeman
2011 - First Team: C  First Team: C Ronnie Freeman
2011 - First Team: P  First Team: P Ben Mount
2011 - Second Team: C  Second Team: C Tommy Murphy
2011 - Second Team: 1B  Second Team: 1B Trey Mancini
2011 - SecondTeam: 2B  Second Team: 2B Paul McKonkey
2012 - First Team: DH  First Team: DH Paul McKonkey
2013 - First Team: 3B  First Team: 3B Brenden Hendricks
2013 - First Team: P  First Team: P Mike Burke
2013 - Second Team: P Second Team: P Jordan Hillyer
2016 - Second Team: DH Second Team: DH Hezekiah Randolph
2017 - First Team: CL First Team: CL Tyler Smith

Professional alumni
Below is a list of Concord Quarry Dogs (2001–2007), Holyoke Blue Sox (2008–2012) and Valley Blue Sox (2014–2014) alumni who have gone on to play professional baseball at the AA level or higher.  The alumni are sorted by peak level of baseball in which they have participated.

MLB

AAA

AA

See also
Holyoke Millers, minor league team based out of Mackenzie Stadium, 1977-1982

References

External links
 Valley Blue Sox Official Site
 NECBL Website

New England Collegiate Baseball League teams
Amateur baseball teams in Massachusetts
Sports in Holyoke, Massachusetts
2001 establishments in New Hampshire
Baseball teams established in 2001